2gether: Again is the sophomore and final album by the fictional boy band 2gether, released in 2000. It serves as the soundtrack album for the 2ge+her television series, just as their first album soundtracked the made-for-MTV movie that introduced the band.

Unlike their previous comedic album, intended for the one-off comedy television movie special, this album has a different approach. Due to the success of that film, with the extended television series tied to this album, 2gether becomes a solidified ensemble, and thus this release features a more professional and commercial production tone. 

The album includes the single "Awesum Luvr", and the hit single "The Hardest Part of Breaking Up (Is Getting Back Your Stuff)", which came in after two weeks on SoundScan singles charts at #14, five slots ahead of the champions at the time, 'N Sync.

Track listing

Singles
"The Hardest Part Of Breaking Up (Is Getting Back Your Stuff)" - released August 1, 2000.
"Awesum Luvr" - released November 14, 2000; did not chart.

Personnel
Evan Farmer – vocals, background vocals
Noah Bastian – vocals, background vocals
Michael Cuccione – vocals, background vocals
Kevin Farley – vocals, background vocals
Alex Solowitz – vocals, background vocals, co-writing on "Regular Guy"
Nigel Dick – writing
Andrew Fromm – writing
Brian Gunn – writing
Mark Gunn – writing
Brian Kierulf – writing
Veit Renn – writing
Joshua M. Schwartz – writing
Brian Steckler –  writing, production

Charts
Album

Single

References

2000 albums
2gether (band) albums